Formerie is a commune in the Oise department in northern France. On 1 January 2019, the former commune Boutavent was merged into Formerie. Formerie station has rail connections to Amiens and Rouen.

See also
 Communes of the Oise department

References

Communes of Oise